The Regent's Wife is a 1975 Spanish drama film directed by Gonzalo Suárez. It was entered into the 9th Moscow International Film Festival.

Cast
 Pilar Bardem
 Keith Baxter
 Nigel Davenport
 Maruchi Fresno
 Rosario García Ortega
 Agustín González
 Charo López
 Adolfo Marsillach
 Isabel Mestres
 Emma Penella
 María Luisa Ponte

References

External links
 

1975 films
1975 drama films
Spanish drama films
1970s Spanish-language films
Films directed by Gonzalo Suárez
Films scored by Angelo Francesco Lavagnino
1970s Spanish films